Essendon Fields Airport , colloquially known by its former name Essendon Airport, is a  public airport serving scheduled commercial, corporate-jet, charter and general aviation flights. It is located next to the intersection of the Tullamarine and Calder Freeways, in the north western suburb of Essendon Fields of Melbourne, Victoria, Australia. In 1970, Tullamarine Airport replaced Essendon as Melbourne's main airport.

History
The area of the airport was originally known as St Johns, after an early landowner. The airport was proclaimed as Essendon Aerodrome by the Commonwealth Government in 1921. For some time prior to proclamation, the aerodrome had been used by the Victorian Chapter of the Australian Aero Club (renamed the Royal Victorian Aero Club), having initially been based at Point Cook. The Aero Club remained at Essendon until the late 1940s when it transferred to Moorabbin Airport.

Originally the airport had grass runways with the first tenants moving in from December 1921, including H.J. Larkin, Captain Matthews, Bob Hart, and Major Harry Shaw.

The 1920s period saw the great pioneering aviation flights of Sir Charles Kingsford Smith who visited the airport on several occasions. On 16 August 1926 70,000 people swarmed across the grassy fields of Essendon Aerodrome upon the arrival of aviation pioneer Alan Cobham when he landed his de Havilland DH.50 floatplane, flown from England to Australia.

Essendon Aerodrome was the location of the first parachute jump by a woman in Australia. On 21 November 1937 Jean Burns, a seventeen year old member of the Aero Club, leapt from a DH4 in front of a crowd of hundreds of people and landed in a nearby paddock.

The Aerodrome was extended with additional land during the 1930s. Owing to non-availability of cement however, this runway was constructed in flexible-type pavement, primed and sealed with bitumen.

Melbourne Airport (1950–1970)
Essendon became Australia's second, and Melbourne's first, international airport in February 1950. The airport was renamed Melbourne Airport, and the first international commercial flight arrived from New Zealand a year later. In the 1950s Essendon Airport was too small for the larger pure jets, such as the Boeing 707. The airport was surrounded by housing and expansion was impossible.

At this time, Essendon was no longer named Melbourne Airport, with the new airport rapidly taking shape. Commercial international flights were transferred to the new airport in 1970, with commercial domestic flights following the next year.

The major passenger airlines using Essendon in the postwar years until scheduled air services were transferred to Tullamarine were Ansett Airlines and Trans Australia Airlines.

A variety of aircraft were used through Essendon in the 1960s – Lockheed L-188 Electras; Vickers Viscounts; Fokker F27 Friendships; Douglas DC-3s, DC-4s, and DC-6s; de Havilland Comets, and from 1964, Boeing 727s. Douglas DC-9s were introduced later in the decade.

International flights departed mainly from Sydney during Essendon's years of operation, and there were regular daily flights between the two largest metropolitan areas in Australia.

Some notable arrivals at the airport include:
 1964 – The Beatles, upon arrival, waved to thousands of teenagers from the viewing deck of Essendon Airport's main terminal building.
1967 – United States President Lyndon B. Johnson for the memorial service of Prime Minister Harold Holt. Johnson's aircraft Air Force One landed at Essendon Airport on 22 December 1967 then flew empty to Tullamarine as its weight when refuelled was too heavy for Essendon's tarmac.
 1973 – Sir Robert Helpmann co-directed with Rudolf Nureyev, The Australian Ballet film of Don Quixote in F hangar.
 1987 – Kylie Minogue filmed her first-ever music video for her debut single Locomotion here.

Post 2000 
In 2001, the Commonwealth Government sold its management rights for the airport to Edgelear Pty. Ltd., a consortium of the Linfox transport group owned by transport tycoon Lindsay Fox (which also owns Avalon Airport), and the Becton group of companies. Executive, corporate, and privately owned aircraft are based here along with charter, freight, and regional Victorian airlines who currently operate from the airport as well as several flight training schools. The airport also provides warehousing facilities, and a home to the Victorian Air Ambulance, Royal Flying Doctor Service and the Victoria Police Air Wing.

In 2007, the airport was re-designed under a new master plan, as part of the Essendon Fields development. This master plan caters to the future of the site for both aviation and non-aviation use. A new access road and off-ramp were constructed from the Tullamarine Freeway to enter the airport precinct from the north, rather than the common Matthews Avenue entry point. This has necessitated the construction of an Aero-Crossing as the new access road crosses a taxiway. Most of the aviation users of the former 'Northern Hangars' have moved to other sites on the airport with the notable exceptions of the Victoria Police Air Wing and Executive Airlines. The Police Air Wing is due to move to a new facility in the future as the former 'Northern Hangars' are scheduled to be removed as non-aviation businesses purchase sites in that area. Executive Airlines will continue to operate from their present building.  
The airfield itself also has undergone a major upgrade with the installation of lighting and signage systems to bring the airport to International Civil Aviation Organization standards. There are now taxiway signs, and the taxiway and runway lighting has been upgraded to new units. The runway lighting is now medium intensity on runway 17/35 and upgraded to high intensity on 08/26. This alleviates the loss of the approach lighting system previously. Also during this upgrade, the old Fixed Distance Lighting and Visual Approach Slope Indicator systems were decommissioned and replaced with new Precision Approach Path Indicator systems on the left side of all runways. A new Pilot Activated Lighting or PAL system was also installed to allow the lighting system to remain off when not required for use by aircraft.

In November 2007 Essendon Airport released its latest master plan. The master plan details further proposals to expand aviation activities. These plans have been opposed by the local residents' group "Close Essendon Airport" and local political representatives Kelvin Thomson MP and Judy Maddigan. A competing group known as "Save Essendon Airport" was formed and led by Lincoln Robinson and wants the airport to stay open for air ambulance, aircraft charter, and aircraft maintenance services. Within one week the group had more than 500 members and over 2,000 signatures on a petition. Shortly after its launch and lobbying the then Government announced that the airport would remain.

Recent history
In November 2017, the airport was renamed from Essendon Airport to Essendon Fields Airport, reflecting the name of the suburb it is situated in. In 2019, the renovation of the airport terminal was completed. It was the first major renovation since the airport opened in 1959.

The Essendon Airport Air Traffic Control Tower is listed on the Commonwealth Heritage List.

Accidents and incidents

On 18 May 1942, a United States Army Air Forces Consolidated LB-30 Liberator crashed on landing at Essendon airfield. The Liberator had earlier taken off from Essendon when smoke was observed in the cockpit, prompting the pilot to return the aircraft to the airfield. One person was killed when he fell out of the nose wheel doors after the crash landing. The aircraft subsequently burst into flames. The rest of the crew members suffered burns but escaped alive.

On 31 January 1945, a heavily modified Stinson Model A registered VH-UYY and named Tokana, operated by Australian National Airways, departed from Essendon Airport for the daily flight to Kerang. On board were eight passengers and two pilots. About twenty minutes later the aircraft broke up in mid-air, killing all on board. The aircraft had suffered fatigue failure of its left wing. The accident investigators believed this was the first crash of an aircraft due to metal fatigue.

On 10 July 1978, a Partenavia P.68 on a training flight crashed shortly after taking off from Essendon Airport with three people on board. Six people on the ground were killed and one seriously injured; and the three occupants of the aircraft were also seriously injured.
On 3 September 1986, a Cessna 402 air ambulance aircraft crashed shortly after taking off from Essendon airport with six on board. All six were killed after the aircraft burst into flames upon crashing to the ground in what is today the suburb of Gowanbrae.
On 3 December 1993, a de Havilland DH.104 Dove on a charter dinner flight crashed in a suburban street shortly after taking off from the airport with ten people on board. Five occupants of the aircraft suffered serious injuries and one person on the ground suffered minor injuries. Six houses were damaged in the crash.
On 21 February 2017, a Beechcraft B200 King Air bound for King Island crashed into the DFO Essendon shopping centre in the airport grounds at 8:59am shortly after taking off, killing all five people on board. The shopping centre wasn't due to open until 10am.

Airlines and destinations

Two airlines operate scheduled passenger flights from Essendon Airport and there are numerous charter operators.

Other operators
 Royal Flying Doctor Service of Australia
 Ambulance Victoria
 Victoria Police Air Wing

See also

 List of airports in the Melbourne area
 Transport in Australia
 United States Army Air Forces in Australia (World War II)
 List of airports in Victoria

References

 Essendon Airport History on Strathmore Community Website

External links

 
 Airways Museum

Transport in Melbourne
Airports in Victoria (Australia)
Airports established in 1921
Buildings and structures in the City of Moonee Valley
Transport in the City of Moonee Valley
Airfields of the United States Army Air Forces in Australia
1921 establishments in Australia
Essendon, Victoria